Sridharan Sriram (born 21 February 1976) is an Indian cricket coach and former cricketer. He is a left-handed batsman and a left-arm orthodox spin bowler. He played in the Indian Cricket League and the Indian Premier League.On 19 August, 2022, he was appointed as the technical consultant (T20I) of the Bangladesh Men's Cricket Team till the T20 World Cup 2022.

Playing career 
Sriram started his cricketing career as a left-arm spinner and took 29 wickets on India's Under-19 tour of South Africa in the 1992–93 season. However, playing for Tamil Nadu, it was his batting which brought him wider recognition. His most prolific season was in 1999-2000 when he scored 1075 runs in the Ranji Trophy including 5 centuries, and was named as an Indian Cricket Cricketer of the Year. Sriram was selected in 2000 for the first intake of the National Cricket Academy in Bangalore.

His consistent domestic form resulted in a call-up to the India national cricket team, and he made his One Day International debut against South Africa at Nagpur on 19 March 2000. However, a string of low scores meant that he lost his place in the squad after 6 matches.

Sriram continued to score heavily in domestic cricket for Tamil Nadu, and he earned a second chance with the national team for the tour of Bangladesh in 2004-05. He played in the first 2 ODIs, taking 3 wickets in the first, and scoring 57 in a losing cause in the second. However, this was to be his last match for India.

He moved from Tamil Nadu to Maharashtra in 2006. Sriram has also played as an overseas player for the Scottish Saltires in English domestic cricket in 2004, and has been regularly selected for the South Zone cricket team in the Duleep Trophy. He currently plays for Goa.

In 2007, Sriram decided to sign with the Indian Cricket League.
Although he quit Indian Cricket League in 2009 and accepted amnesty offer from BCCI to be back into the reckoning for selection at international level.

Coaching career 

He worked with the Australia A squad that toured India in 2015. He was also named as a coaching consultant for the Australian cricket team during the Test series in Bangladesh in 2015. He also accompanied the Australian cricket team during the 2019 Ashes.

In 2019, he was appointed as the batting and spin bowling coach of Royal Challengers Bangalore.
He also was a spin bowling coach for Australia which hosted India for 4 match test series in 2018. 
On 19 August 2022, he was confirmed as a technical consultant for Bangladesh for T20Is format.

References

External links 
 

1976 births
Living people
India One Day International cricketers
South Zone cricketers
Maharashtra cricketers
Tamil Nadu cricketers
Scotland cricketers
Himachal Pradesh cricketers
Goa cricketers
Assam cricketers
Delhi Capitals cricketers
Royal Challengers Bangalore cricketers
Chennai Superstars cricketers
ICL India XI cricketers
Ahmedabad Rockets cricketers
Tamil sportspeople
Indian cricket coaches